The Nowhere Inn is a 2020 American mockumentary psychological thriller-comedy film , directed by Bill Benz, from a screenplay by Annie Clark and Carrie Brownstein. It stars Clark, Brownstein, and Dakota Johnson.

It had its world premiere at the Sundance Film Festival on January 25, 2020. It was released on September 17, 2021, by IFC Films, and its soundtrack was released on the same day by Loma Vista.

Plot
St. Vincent sets out to make a documentary about her music, but when she hires Carrie Brownstein – a close friend of hers – to direct the project, reality, identity, and authenticity grow bizarre.

Cast
Annie Clark as herself
Carrie Brownstein as herself
Dakota Johnson as herself
Ezra Buzzington as Limo Driver
Toko Yasuda as herself
Chris Aquilino as Neil 
Drew Connick as Robert
Michael Bofshever as Mr. Brownstein, Carrie's Dad

Production

In April 2019, it was announced Annie Clark and Carrie Brownstein had joined the cast of the film, with Bill Benz directing from a screenplay by Clark and Brownstein. The project is not a documentary but a scripted film that was to have been shot like a documentary.

Soundtrack

The Nowhere Inn is the soundtrack album released along with the film. It was released on digital streaming services on September 17, 2021, and later on vinyl on April 23, 2022, as part of the Record Store Day.

All tracks written and produced by Annie Clark, except where noted.

Charts

Release
It had its world premiere at the Sundance Film Festival on January 25, 2020. The film was scheduled to screen at South by Southwest and the Tribeca Film Festival; however both festivals were cancelled due to the COVID-19 pandemic. In March 2021, IFC Films acquired distribution rights to the film. It was released on September 17, 2021. The soundtrack album composed by Clark was released on the same day.

Reception
The website's critics consensus reads: "The Nowhere Inn may be a clever concept in search of substance, but the results are often oddly appealing." On Metacritic, The Nowhere Inn has an above average score of 60 out of a 100 based on 18 critics, indicating "mixed or average reviews".

Nick Allen of RogerEbert.com wrote "St. Vincent and Brownstein prove to be an incredible pair to study at the center of this movie's kaleidoscope, and the film is befitting their boundless and generous creativity".

Lorry Kikta of Film Threat wrote "On top of all the philosophical queries that The Nowhere Inn gives us, it also features some fantastic live concert footage and great music overall".

Accolade
The film was awarded with The ReFrame Stamp for its gender balanced production.

References

External links
 

2020 comedy films
2020 psychological thriller films
2020s American films
2020s comedy thriller films
2020s English-language films
2020s mockumentary films
American comedy thriller films
American mockumentary films
American psychological thriller films
Films about music and musicians
IFC Films films
St. Vincent (musician) albums
Topic Studios films